The 1986 Tour de Suisse was the 50th edition of the Tour de Suisse cycle race and was held from 10 June to 29 June 1986. The race started in Winterthur and finished in Zürich. The race was won by Andrew Hampsten of the La Vie Claire team.

General classification

References

1986
Tour de Suisse
1986 Super Prestige Pernod International